USS Deimos may refer to:

, was launched 28 December 1942 and scuttled 23 June 1943
USS Deimos (AKL-40), was the former Army FS-500, acquired by the Navy 12 December 1951, and loaned to the Republic of Korea the same day

United States Navy ship names